John Egan (1840–1897) was an Irish piper.

Egan, known as The Albino piper was a native of Dunmore, County Galway. Like his countyman Patsy Touhey, he was lefthanded. His tutor in pipe music as Liam Dáll Connolly, and his grandson, John Burke (piper). 

He emigrated to the United States and spent much of his subsequent life in New York City, barring tours with John Cronan and Patsy Touhey across eastern states.

Francis O'Neill preserves a comment by Nicholas Burke  on Egan, who stated that Egan "was a grand player and very powerful in his music." 

Egan died in New York in 1897.

References

 Famous Pipers who flourished principally in the second half of the nineteenth century Chapter 21 in Irish Minstrels and Musicians, by Capt. Francis O'Neill, 1913.

External links
 http://billhaneman.ie/IMM/IMM-XXI.html

1840 births
1897 deaths
Musicians from County Galway
Musicians from New York City
Irish expatriates in the United States
Irish uilleann pipers